The Sanctuary of Our Lady of Arantzazu  is a Franciscan sanctuary located in Oñati, Basque Country, Spain. The shrine is a much appreciated place among Gipuzkoans, with the Virgin of Arantzazu being the sanctuary's namesake and patron saint of the province along with Ignatius of Loyola.

The place benefits from the highland silence and peaceful atmosphere of the Aizkorri mountain range along with a good road infrastructure, so the place is frequently visited by devotees and regional and foreign tourists alike. It is located in the site where presumably the Virgin of Arantzazu appeared to the shepherd Rodrigo de Balanzategui in 1468. Legend has it the figure of the Virgin was in a thorn-bush, and his exclamation "Arantzan zu?!" (Thou, among the thorns?!) gave rise to the name of the place. According to the linguistic explanation, the name stems from "arantza + zu", 'place abounding in hawthorn'.

Arantzazu can be found as a female name in Spain in the forms of Arantza and Arantzazu (especially in Biscay and Gipuzkoa) along with Arancha (Spanish spelling) or Arantxa (Basque spelling), much in line with Spanish phonetics.

The place is also a starting point for several mountains trails and circuits for hikers that provide access to the meadows of Urbia and on to the mountain range Aizkorri, to the massif Aloña and to the lands south and east of the shrine. All the trails are well signalled.

Pope Leo XIII granted a Canonical coronation to the image on 6 June 1886. A variant replica bearing its same title was brought to the Philippines in 1705, featuring a standing posture. Pope Francis granted a Canonical coronation to the Philippine image on 31 May 2017. The image is currently enshrined  in the Diocesan Shrine and Parish of Our Lady of Arantzazu in San Mateo, Rizal.

Etymology 

The name of the sanctuary, the place, and the Virgin are all related to the legend of her appearance.  The word arantzazu itself is made up of "arantza" which means "thorn" and the suffix "zu" indicating "abundance", making the translation "abundance of thorns", making reference to the abundant thorny bushes that grow in the area.

Esteban de Garibay, in his Compendio historial de las Chrónicas y universal historia de todos los Reynos d'España (1571), states that the Virgin appeared to a young girl named María de Datuxtegui.  In the same book, however, he gives another version, which is better known.  Garibay says that he heard this story from the mouth of a witness who knew a shepherd named Rodrigo de Balanzategui.  This man had said he found a small image of the Virgin with a child in her arms, hidden in a thorny bush, next to a cowbell.  Upon seeing it, he exclaimed, Arantzan zu?!, meaning "In the thorns, you?!".

This legend again appears in the first history of the sanctuary written by Franciscan Gaspar de Gamarra, twenty years later in 1648:

Historian Padre Lizarralde, who created the sanctuary's coat of arms, based its design on the legend, and drew a thorn bush, out of which a star blooms, and with its light it scares away the dragon, sending it into the abyss.  The legend reads “Arantzan zu”.

The basilica 

In 1950 the works for the new basilica were started, and the building was inaugurated five years later. Francisco Javier Sáenz de Oiza and Luis Laorga were the leading architects, and other artists also took part in the work:

Lucio Muñoz, the altarpiece
Jorge Oteiza, the sculptures of the Apostles
Eduardo Chillida, the entrance gates
Nestor Basterretxea, the paintings of the crypt
Xabier Álvarez de Eulate, the stained-glass windows

The Franciscan convent has been a center for Basque culture even under Franco's repression.

The main festivity in Arantzazu is on September 9.

References

 Joxe Azurmendi, Joseba Intxausti, Javier Garrido, Migel Alonso Del Val (2007): The Sanctuary of Arantzatzu, Fontanellato: FMR,

External links

 Arantzazu in the Bernardo Estornés Lasa - Auñamendi Encyclopedia (Euskomedia Fundazioa) (in Spanish)
 Sanctuary main page

Churches in the Basque Country (autonomous community)
Shrines to the Virgin Mary
Franciscan monasteries in Spain
Basilica churches in Spain
Roman Catholic shrines in Spain